The women's 100 metres hurdles event at the 2022 African Championships in Athletics was held on 8 and 9 June in Port Louis, Mauritius.

Medalists

Results

Heats
Qualification: First 3 of each heat (Q) and the next 2 fastest (q) qualified for the final.

Wind:Heat 1: +3.1 m/s, Heat 2: +2.5 m/s

Final
Wind: +4.0 m/s

References

2022 African Championships in Athletics
Sprint hurdles at the African Championships in Athletics